A. K. Azizul Huq was the third Comptroller and Auditor General of Bangladesh.  He was born on 29 March 1929.  He took oath of office as Comptroller and Auditor General of Bangladesh on 1 January 1983 and retired on 29 March, 1989.

A. K. Azizul Huq also served as the Secretary, Internal Resources Division in the Ministry of Finance, Government of Bangladesh and Chairman, National Board of Revenue, Additional Secretary, Ministry of Finance and various other senior positions with Government of Bangladesh and Pakistan. He had Bachelors and master's degrees in English literature from  University of Dhaka and a Diploma in Advanced Theory of Economic Development from University of Manchester.

Azizul Huq died on 19 July 2013.

References

1929 births
2013 deaths
University of Dhaka alumni
Alumni of the University of Manchester
Political office-holders in Bangladesh